Andrew Thomas Nicholson (born 12 July 1970 in Auckland) is a speed skater and short track speed skater from New Zealand. He competed for New Zealand in three Winter Olympic Games. Nicholson is also an endurance cyclist and previously held the Guinness world record for around the world cycling. Nicholson started and ended this journey at Auckland International Airport, New Zealand, between 12 August and 13 December 2015. This was an unsupported ride.

In the 1992 Winter Olympics at Albertville; the team he was in came 4th in the 5000m short track speed skating relay and 28th in the 1000m short track speed skating.

In the 1994 Winter Olympics at Lillehammer; he came 27th in the 1000m short track speed skating.

In the 1998 Winter Olympics at Nagano; he came 35th in the 1000m speed skating and 40th in the 1500m speed skating.

He is a brother of cyclist and speed skater Chris Nicholson.

References 
 Black Gold by Ron Palenski (2008, 2004 New Zealand Sports Hall of Fame, Dunedin) p. 106

External links 
Andrew Nicholson at ISU
 Andrew Nicholson at the NZOC website
 

1970 births
Living people
New Zealand male speed skaters
New Zealand male short track speed skaters
Olympic speed skaters of New Zealand
Olympic short track speed skaters of New Zealand
Short track speed skaters at the 1992 Winter Olympics
Short track speed skaters at the 1994 Winter Olympics
Speed skaters at the 1998 Winter Olympics